The 1983 Monaco Grand Prix was a Formula One motor race held at Monaco on 15 May 1983. It was the fifth race of the 1983 Formula One World Championship. The 76-lap race was won by Finnish driver Keke Rosberg, driving a Williams-Ford, with Brazilian Nelson Piquet second in a Brabham-BMW and Frenchman Alain Prost third in a Renault.

Thirty years later, Rosberg's son Nico won the 2013 race, making them the first father and son to win in the principality.

Classification

Pre-qualifying

Qualifying

Race

Championship standings after the race

Drivers' Championship standings

Constructors' Championship standings

Note: Only the top five positions are included for both sets of standings.

References

Monaco Grand Prix
Monaco Grand Prix
Grand Prix
May 1983 sports events in Europe